Joel Andrew Smeenge (born April 1, 1968) is a former American football defensive end in the National Football League (NFL) for the New Orleans Saints and the Jacksonville Jaguars. He played 11 seasons in the NFL from 1990–2000. He played college football at Western Michigan University. Smeenge attended Hudsonville High School along with other notable Hudsonvillian, Major League Baseball's John Vander Wal.

Herb Deromedi, head coach at Central Michigan, was quoted in saying, "in Joel you have one of the top defensive players we've ever seen in the Mid-American Conference. He ranks right up there with Jack Lambert and John Offerdahl."

Quick, tough and hard hitting, Smeenge was one of the nation's most impressive defensive ends in 1989. His 4.65 speed made him a dangerous pass rusher and explosive tackler. Smeenge was an All-MAC outside linebacker as a sophomore in 1987, and was selected as an all-conference defensive end the next two seasons. Smeenge led the conference with 20 tackles for a loss in 1988 and 18 in 1989.

Joel invested in some car dealerships and real estate developments which ultimately led to filing of both personal and business bankruptcies in 2010.

References

Living people
1968 births
People from Holland, Michigan
American football defensive ends
Western Michigan Broncos football players
New Orleans Saints players
Jacksonville Jaguars players
Players of American football from Michigan